Saint-Pierre-de-Clairac (Languedocien: Sent Pèir de Clairac) is a commune in the Lot-et-Garonne department in south-western France.

Geography
The Séoune forms part of the commune's eastern border, flows westward through the middle of the commune, then forms part of its western border.

See also
Communes of the Lot-et-Garonne department

References

Saintpierredeclairac